Charles Sanna (November 9, 1917 – March 13, 2019) was an American inventor, best known for inventing Swiss Miss instant hot chocolate.

References 

1917 births
2019 deaths
20th-century American inventors
American centenarians
Men centenarians
People from Menomonie, Wisconsin